Monchy & Alexandra were a bachata musical group from the Dominican Republic. They sang together as a duo beginning in 1998.  Their first big hit was "Hoja en Blanco",  which they released in 1999. Since then, they had many other hits, such as "Hasta el Fin" and "Perdidos", both from their 2004 album Hasta el Fin, as well as "No Es Una Novela" from their 2006 Éxitos y Más album.  They have been often credited with being instrumental in popularizing bachata music outside of the Dominican Republic.

Formation
Monchy (real name Ramón Rijo, born 19 September 1977 in La Romana) first performed in a group in the Dominican Republic, which earned him a place in the recording of the Bachatazos series of releases.

Alexandra (full name Alexandra Cabrera de la Cruz, born 19 October 1978 in Santo Domingo) was attending a university in 1998, but her studies were put on hold when the opportunity arose to audition for arranger/producer Martires De Leon and executive producer Victor Reyes, who were looking for someone to pair with Monchy. Alexandra won and began the duo that would become Monchy & Alexandra. The pair's first hit, in fact, was recorded without the two having ever met in person; Rijo recorded his vocal while the search for a female duet partner was still in progress.

Success
Monchy & Alexandra released the album Hoja en Blanco in 1999.  Promotion of the album was slowed by visa problems and unauthorized cover versions.  Even so, slowly, requests for the song began to flood into Miami, leading tropical radio stations WXDJ and WRTO to launch Sunday-afternoon bachata programs and to incorporate the music style into their regular programming. Miami station WXDJ even added the word "bachata" to its slogan.  They were the first bachata act to perform on the show Sabado Gigante in April 2001, after their single "Hoja en Blanco" began to finally climb the Billboard charts in the US. Cabrera credited their success in part to their early singles' roots in the vallenato genre, noting that vallenato lyrics traditionally are "sweeter [and] more romantic" in contrast to the traditionally bitter lyrics favored in the male-dominated bachata scene. 

According to Monchy, the duo waited two years before releasing their next album in order to "put out something superior to Hoja en Blanco".  Label executives from J&N worked to improve the odds for commercial success for the second album. Their marketing efforts included a $300,000 national TV advertising campaign for Puerto Rico and the U.S. (consisting of 30 and 60 second spots) and a $17,000 video filmed in Miami. This marketing campaign was the first such for a bachata group; prior to that all marketing had concentrated on compilation albums.  The album was released on March 5, 2002. The album's lead single "Te Quiero Igual que Ayer" was written by the same composer, Wilfran Castillo, that penned "Hoja en Blanco." The song peaked at number 23 on Billboard's Hot Latin Tracks, and reached number four on Billboard's Tropical/Salsa Airplay chart.

In 2005, the duo performed with Salvadoran singer Álvaro Torres, He Venido A Pedirte Perdón, on an album contributing to Mexican singer, Juan Gabriel.

Critical reception
Monchy & Alexandra have been recognized by some of the most prestigious organizations of the Hispanic music business. They have been nominated for the Billboard Latin Music Awards, Premios Cassandra, Premios Lo Nuestro and a Latin Grammy. The duo has achieved a large amount of success in a relatively short amount of time.

In 2003, the duo received its first major awards, "Tropical Album of the Year, Duo or Group" (for Confesiones) and "Tropical Airplay Song of the Year, Duo or Group" (for "Te Quiero Igual Que Ayer") from the Billboard Latin Music Awards. The pair also won the Tropical Album of the Year award for Éxitos y Más (Hits and More) and the Tropical Song of the Year prize for "No Es Una Novela" (It's Not a Novela) at the 2007 Premios Lo Nuestro ceremony.

Break up
On September 15, 2008 Monchy announced that the group would be breaking up.  He attributed the decision to split solely to Alexandra saying "The decision was Alexandra's. I still don't know the reasons why, only that when I was informed about this, the reasons were not explained to me and  this occurred while we were on a European tour, in Milan, Italy." Monchy disputed rumors that the split was over money.

Reunion

In 2019 the duo reunited to  collaborate on a track called Años Luz with
Romeo Santos. They have no plans to return as a duo for future projects.

Discography

Studio
Hoja En Blanco (1999)
Confesiones (2002)
Hasta El Fin (2004)

Live
Unplugged (2000)
En Vivo Desde Bellas Artes (Live from Bellas Artes) (2008)

Compilations
Éxitos & Más (2006)

Remix
The Mix (2003)

Notes

Footnotes

External links
 

Dominican Republic musical groups
Dominican Republic singers
Bachata music groups
Musical groups established in 1998
Musical groups disestablished in 2008